Kelley Menighan Hensley  (born February 15, 1967, in Glenview, Illinois) is an American actress best known for her role as Emily Stewart on As the World Turns.
She appeared on the program from 1992 until the series finale in 2010. She earned Daytime Emmy Nominations in 2002 and again in 2008 for Best Supporting Actress.

Hensley also made a cross-over to the daytime drama, The Young and the Restless on March 27, 2007, portraying Emily opposite Adrienne Frantz's Amber Moore.

In 2012, Hensley appeared on the Showtime dark satire series Reality Show. She played Katherine Warwick, the matriarch of a family being recorded for a reality TV series without their knowledge or permission.

From 2013 to 2014, Hensley portrayed Veronica Ashton on the soap opera web series Tainted Dreams.

Personal life
She married her co-star Jon Hensley (Holden Snyder) on May 25, 1996. Together, she and Hensley have three children. In May 2017, Menighan Hensley announced she had split from Hensley back in 2015.

Hensley has said that she is never without Chanel No. 5 and is a vegetarian in everyday life.

References

External links

1967 births
American soap opera actresses
Living people
People from Glenview, Illinois
People from Old Tappan, New Jersey
Actresses from Illinois
20th-century American actresses
American television actresses
21st-century American women